Totta may refer to:

 Banco Santander Totta
 Totta Näslund
 Matthieu Totta
 Totta—alternate spelling for Tota, an 8th century Bishop of Selsey